Leszek Marian Kosedowski (born May 25, 1954 in Środa Śląska) is a retired boxer from Poland, who won a bronze medal in the men's featherweight  division (– 57 kg) at the 1976 Summer Olympics in Montreal, Quebec, Canada. There he was defeated in the semifinals by the eventual silver medalist, Richard Nowakowski of East Germany.

His younger brothers, Krzysztof Kosedowski and Dariusz Kosedowski, were also boxers who competed in the Olympics for Poland.

1976 Olympic results 
Below are the results of Leszek Kosedowski, a Polish featherweight boxer who competed at the 1976 Montreal Olympics:

 Round of 64: bye
 Round of 32: Defeated Cornelius Boza-Edwards (Uganda) by walkover; country boycotted
 Round of 16: Defeated Camille Huard (Canada) by decision, 5-0
 Quarterfinal: Defeated Bratislav Ristić (Yugoslavia) by decision, 5-0
 Semifinal: Lost to Richard Nowakowski (East Germany) by decision, 0-5

References
 databaseOlympics
 Polish Olympic Committee

1954 births
Featherweight boxers
Boxers at the 1976 Summer Olympics
Olympic boxers of Poland
Olympic bronze medalists for Poland
Living people
People from Środa Śląska
Olympic medalists in boxing
Medalists at the 1976 Summer Olympics
Sportspeople from Lower Silesian Voivodeship
Polish male boxers